Soli (also Romanized as Solī) is a village in Chelevand Rural District, Lavandevil District, Astara County, Gilan Province, Iran. At the 2006 census, its population was 30, in 6 families.

References 

Populated places in Astara County